Theodore Anderson (10 August 1878 – 29 August 1926) was an Australian cricketer and psychiatrist. 

Anderson played two first-class matches for Scotland in 1905 and 1906, and four for Western Australia between 1908/09 and 1909/10. He was Deputy Inspector-General of the Insane for Western Australia from 1908 to 1915, and Inspector-General of the Insane from 1915 until he resigned in 1926. He died suddenly of pneumonia in Melbourne shortly afterwards.

See also
 List of Western Australia first-class cricketers

References

External links
 

1878 births
1926 deaths
People from Warrnambool
People educated at Scotch College, Melbourne
University of Melbourne alumni
Alumni of the University of Edinburgh Medical School
Australian cricketers
Scotland cricketers
Western Australia cricketers
Australian psychiatrists
Deaths from pneumonia in Victoria (Australia)